Gary L. Olson is professor emeritus of political science at Moravian College in Bethlehem, Pennsylvania, United States. He is the author of: Empathy Imperiled: Capitalism, Culture, and the Brain; How the World Works; U.S. Foreign Policy and the Third World Peasant; and The Other Europe. He has written over 75 published articles and op-eds, many for ZNet. His research areas include international political economy, identity politics and global labor issues. During the 1980s, he sponsored several trips to the Soviet Union with his students from Moravian College.

He was also very active during the late 1990s with the Labor Party, nationally and in the Lehigh Valley, Pennsylvania.

Gary Olson is the father of award-winning spoken word/folk poet Alix Olson.

Education
B.A., Concordia College, Moorhead
M.A., University of South Dakota
Ph.D., University of Colorado

Awards and fellowships
Fulbright and Malone Fellowships: Finland, Egypt, Syria,  [Palestine] Kuwait, Jordan, Israel, and Mexico

Lindback Award for Distinguished Teaching (1979)
NIH Fellow (UNC - Chapel Hill)
NEH Summer Fellowships (1979, 1982, 1989, 1991, 1995)

References

External links
Olson's homepage at Moravian College
"Music, Meetings and Markets" (article at ZNet)
"Radical Teaching" (article at ZNet)
"Liberals and Nader" (article at ZNet)
https://web.archive.org/web/20060619054056/http://israelsoldiers.org/
https://www.amazon.com/Gary-L.-Olson/e/B001HOX6VI Gary L. Olson's books

Living people
American political scientists
Moravian University faculty
Year of birth missing (living people)